Chalceus is a genus of fish that inhabits freshwater habitats in South America. Members can be found in the Amazon and Orinoco basins, as well as in the Guianas and various tributaries of the former. It is the sole representative of the family Chalceidae.

Description 
Members of the genus Chalceus typically reach a length of 15–25 cm (6–10 in), but are up to about 30 cm (12 in). They have an elongated shape, and relatively large scales. Their fins are a variety of colors, most commonly red, yellow, or hyaline, with a red or pink tail being the most common.

Classification 
Chalceus was previously classified as a member of the family Characidae, and is still listed there by some authorities (like GBIF and ITIS). However, recent phylogenetic and morphological analysis has prompted a move into the family Chalceidae, which is currently home only to the genus Chalceus (making it monotypic). This move was also done in order to keep the family Charadicae monophyletic.

Currently, there are five accepted species in the genus Chalceus. In alphabetical order, they are:

 Chalceus epakros Zanata & Toledo-Piza, 2004
 Chalceus erythrurus Cope, 1870 (tucan fish) 
 Chalceus guaporensis Zanata & Toledo-Piza, 2004
 Chalceus macrolepidotus G. Cuvier, 1818 (pinktail chalceus)
 Chalceus spilogyros Zanata & Toledo-Piza, 2004

History 
The genus Chalceus was established by Georges Cuvier in the year 1818 when he described the pinktail chalceus (C. marcolepidotus) as a new species in a new genus. By way of monotypy, the pinktail became the type species therein. The next established species was the tucan fish, C. erythrurus, which was named by Edward Drinker Cope in 1870, though he first classified it in the genus Plethodectes with the full name Plethodectes erythrurus. In 1872, he moved it to Chalceus.

A full redescription of the genus occurred in the year 2004, undertaken by Brazilian biologists Angela M. Zanata and Mônica Toledo-Piza, which resulted in the nomination of the other three species.

Etymology 
The name Chalceus is Greek in origin and comes from the word chalkos, which means copper. This was given by Cuvier because he observed that the original specimen's scales were "sometimes golden" when preserved in alcohol.

References 

Chalceidae
Fish of South America
Taxa named by Georges Cuvier
Ray-finned fish genera